

331001–331100 

|-id=011
| 331011 Peccioli ||  || Peccioli, Italy, a village located in Alta Valdera in the Italian district of Pisa || 
|}

331101–331200 

|-id=105
| 331105 Giselher ||  || Dietrich Giselher Kracht (born 1944) is the elder brother of the discoverer, who introduced him to astronomy at the observatory of the Olbers-Gesellschaft in Bremen. || 
|}

331201–331300 

|-bgcolor=#f2f2f2
| colspan=4 align=center | 
|}

331301–331400 

|-id=316
| 331316 Cavedon ||  || Mario Cavedon (1920–2009) was an Italian astronomer, mathematician, and science writer at the Brera Astronomical Observatory who studied the celestial mechanics of small Solar System bodies and the perturbation of their orbits. || 
|}

331401–331500 

|-bgcolor=#f2f2f2
| colspan=4 align=center | 
|}

331501–331600 

|-bgcolor=#f2f2f2
| colspan=4 align=center | 
|}

331601–331700 

|-bgcolor=#f2f2f2
| colspan=4 align=center | 
|}

331701–331800 

|-id=785
| 331785 Sumners ||  || Carolyn Sumners (born 1948) has taught astronomy at the Houston Museum of Natural Science's Burke Baker Planetarium since 1972. It was her inspiration to move a meter-class telescope to the George Observatory in 1989 for educating the public under the stars. || 
|}

331801–331900 

|-bgcolor=#f2f2f2
| colspan=4 align=center | 
|}

331901–332000 

|-id=992
| 331992 Chasseral ||  || The Chasseral is a mountain of the Jura range, overlooking Lake Biel in the Swiss canton of Bern. || 
|}

References 

331001-332000